Sir Henry Jones (19 July 1862 – 29 October 1926) was an Australian businessman of significance in the development of Tasmanian industry and trade.

Jones, born in Hobart, was the second son of John Jones and his wife Emma, née Matheson (Mapperson). Educated at a state school, Jones went to work in a jam factory when he was 12 years old, and began with sticking labels on tins. He was always willing to work overtime, and saved the money he earned as a result of this industriousness. He then became a foreman, and by 1891, when George Peacock retired from the business, he was able to buy a controlling interest in it, and reconstruct it under the name of H. Jones and Company. The business grew, and in 1898, the works were almost entirely refitted with new machinery and the range of canned goods was increased.

Jones began to extend his interest to the timber trade, hop industry, and the export of Tasmanian fruit in addition to his own preserves. Jones created the brand name IXL (an acronym signifying the words "I excel"). In 1903, his was a leading part in the formation of the Tongkah Harbour Tin Dredging Company, which became very successful, and in 1909-10 a number of the mainland factories were amalgamated with his own into the H. Jones Co-operative Company. Branches of his own factory had been formed at Keswick, South Australia and Sydney. He visited England in 1911 with his family, and relocated to America in 1914. Some five years later, he established a factory in Oakland, California, near San Francisco, which was later sold.

Jones succeeded in securing steamers to carry Tasmanian fruit to the English market, and though his enterprise suffered occasional losses, he never ceased his efforts to vitalize his state's trade. He was interested in early attempts to form a wood pulp industry, and was largely responsible for the erecting of wool mills in Launceston by Kelsall and Kemp of Rochdale, England. Other interests included an orchard on the east coast of Tasmania worked largely by way of a co-operative system. He had become Tasmania's leading businessman, and continuing to work very hard his health became affected in the last two years of his life.

Jones was knighted in the 1919 New Year Honours. He died suddenly at Melbourne on 29 October 1926. He married Alice Glover in 1883, who survived him, as did their three sons and nine daughters.

References

1862 births
1926 deaths
People from Hobart
Australian company founders
Australian Knights Bachelor